Parakaryon myojinensis, also known as the Myojin parakaryote, is a highly unusual species of single-celled organism known only from a single specimen, described in 2012. It has features of both prokaryotes and eukaryotes but is apparently distinct from either group, making it unique among organisms so far discovered. It is the sole species in the genus Parakaryon.

Etymology
The generic name Parakaryon comes from Greek παρά (pará, "beside") and κάρυον (káryon, "kernel", "nucleus"), and reflects its distinction from eukaryotes and prokaryotes.

Structure
Parakaryon myojinensis has some structural features unique to eukaryotes, some features unique to prokaryotes, and some features different to both. The table below details these structures, with matching traits coloured beige.

Classification
It is not clear whether P. myojinensis can or should be classified as a eukaryote or a prokaryote, the two categories to which all other cellular life belongs. Excluding viruses, which are non-cellular and often distinguished from cellular life, and excluding several fossils that contain disputed evidence of ancient life (nanobacteria, nanobes), P. myojinensis is the only organism to have a completely unknown position in the tree of life. Adding to the difficulties of classification, only one instance of this organism has been discovered to date, and so scientists have been unable to study it further.

British evolutionary biologist Nick Lane hypothesized in a 2015 book that the existence of P. myojinensis may be an important clue to the origins of life on Earth, perhaps as an example of the abiogenesis of simple organisms from organic compounds continuing in the present day. The fact that P. myojinensis was discovered near hydrothermal vents, which have been proposed as possible primordial reaction chambers for the earliest ancestors of prokaryotes and eukaryotes, lends credence to this idea.

See also
 Anatoma fujikurai, a species of gastropod discovered at the same location

References

Further reading
 
 

Species described in 2012
Incertae sedis
Monotypic genera
Biota of the Pacific Ocean
Japanese archipelago
Microorganisms
Marine organisms